Rutherfordfjellet is a mountain in Ny-Friesland at Spitsbergen, Svalbard, Norway. It is located at the eastern side of Austfjorden. The mountain is named after physicist Ernest Rutherford. Rutherfordfjellet is part of the Atomfjella mountain range.

References

Mountains of Spitsbergen